Kuehneromyces lignicola is a species of fungi belonging to the family Strophariaceae.

Synonym: Kuehneromyces vernalis (Peck) Singer & A.H.Sm.

It has cosmopolitan distribution.

References

Strophariaceae